HTS Kimberley is a Technical High School in Kimberley, South Africa.
It is the Afrikaans for Hoër Tegniese Skool Kimberley. The English name is THS Kimberley. That stands for Technical High School Kimberley

Established
From 1943 to 1975 a college by the name Technical College Northern Cape existed. In 1976 the College were divided into 2 independent High Schools, namely Technical High School Kimberley  and Northern Cape Trade High School.

Motto

Dexteritas cum Culturia (Latin) Translated it means: Efficient and with Culture.

Gender and language

It is a co-ed school, which teaches in Afrikaans and English.

Alumni

 Edwin Gagiano - South African born actor and model, now living in the United States of America.

References

Kimberley, Northern Cape
Schools in the Northern Cape
High schools in South Africa